Bent Wolmar (born 8 August 1937) was a Danish footballer. And Nuclear physicist

During his club career he played for Aarhus Gymnastik Forening. He earned 6 caps for the Denmark national football team, and was in the finals squad for the 1964 European Nations' Cup.

External links
Profile at DBU

1937 births
Danish men's footballers
Denmark international footballers
1964 European Nations' Cup players
Aarhus Gymnastikforening players
Living people
Association football defenders